Love Among the Ruins may refer to:

Literature
 "Love Among the Ruins" (poem), a poem by Robert Browning
 Love Among the Ruins. A Romance of the Near Future, a novel by Evelyn Waugh
 Love Among the Ruins, a novel by Warwick Deeping
 Love Among the Ruins, a novel by Robert Clark
 Love Among the Ruins, a novel by Angela Thirkell

Other media
 Love Among the Ruins (film), a 1975 TV movie starring Katharine Hepburn and Laurence Olivier 
 Love Among the Ruins (album), an album by 10,000 Maniacs, or the title song
 Love Among the Ruins (Burne-Jones), a painting by Edward Burne-Jones
 "Love Among the Ruins", an episode of the TV series Mad Men
 "Love Among the Ruins", a song by Peter Sarstedt
 "Love Among the Ruins", an E.R. episode

See also
 Love in the Ruins, a novel by Walker Percy